Josh Hokit (born November 12, 1997) is an American football tight end and fullback who is a free agent. He also was a wrestler in college, and earned All-America honors.

Early life and education
Hokit was born on November 12, 1997, in Clovis, California. He attended Clovis High School, excelling in wrestling and football.  As a senior in wrestling, he peaked at number three in the nation. In football that year, Hokit recorded 125 tackles as a linebacker and also rushed for 820 yards with eight touchdowns on offense. He originally accepted a wrestling scholarship to Drexel University, but changed his mind when he learned they didn't have a football team.

Hokit walked-on at Fresno State University, and played in all 12 football games as a freshman. His role that year saw him play linebacker, fullback, running back, and on special teams. He made seven tackles on the season, and his best game against Hawaii, where he rushed for 97 yards on 18 carries. As a sophomore, Hokit appeared in all 14 games and started four. He ranked second on the roster with 583 rushing yards, coming on 128 attempts. He also scored seven touchdowns rushing, the ninth-most in the Mountain West Conference (MWC). In the season opener, he threw a 65-yard touchdown pass to Jared Rice. After the football season ended, Hokit returned to wrestling, placing fifth in the Big 12 championships.

As a junior in 2018, Hokit appeared in 13 of 14 games, making one start. Rushing, he made 260 yards on 73 carries. He scored his lone touchdown of the season against UNLV. He also recorded eight catches for 56 yards, a long of 22. In wrestling, he led the team with 27 wins, and became their first All-America selection since Mario Botelho in 2003.

As a senior in 2019, Hokit played in 12 games, making one start in their matchup with Colorado State. He placed fourth on the roster with 287 rushing yards, and second on the team with nine rushing touchdowns. He also recorded 97 receiving yards and one touchdown on 17 catches. He was team captain for the final four games of the year. As a senior in wrestling, he finished the year being named by the NWCA as a second-team All-America selection, after leading Fresno with 24 wins.

Professional career

San Francisco 49ers
After going unselected in the 2020 NFL Draft, Hokit was signed by the San Francisco 49ers as an undrafted free agent. He was waived at the final roster cuts but re-signed to the practice squad the next day. He was placed on the COVID-19/reserve list on December 23, and activated on December 28. Hokit was signed to a futures contract on January 4, 2021. He was waived at the 2021 final roster cuts but re-signed to the practice squad the next day. He was placed on the reserve-COVID-19 list on January 11, 2022. He signed a reserve/future contract with the 49ers on February 2, 2022. He was waived on August 15, 2022.

Arizona Cardinals
On August 18, 2022, Hokit signed with the Arizona Cardinals, but was waived five days later.

References

Further reading

1997 births
Living people
Players of American football from California
American football fullbacks
Arizona Cardinals players
Fresno State Bulldogs football players
San Francisco 49ers players
Sportspeople from Clovis, California